The Swartzentruber Amish are the best-known and one of the largest and most conservative subgroups of Old Order Amish. Swartzentruber Amish are considered a subgroup of the Old Order Amish, although they do not fellowship or intermarry with more liberal Old Order Amish. They speak Pennsylvania German as their mother tongue as well as English (with outsiders).

History 

Swartzentruber Amish formed as the result of a division that occurred among the Amish of Holmes County, Ohio, in the years 1913–1917. The bishop who broke away was Sam E. Yoder. The Swartzentruber name was applied later, named after bishop Samuel Swartzentruber who succeeded him. In 1932 there was a split among the Swartzentrubers that resulted in the formation of the Troyer Amish in Wayne County, Ohio. In the early 1980s several church districts in Minnesota, Tennessee, and Ohio split from the Swartzentruber church districts elsewhere because of disagreements over shunning ("Bann und Meidung"). This group, known as the "Jeck Jeckey Leit" is now affiliated with the Nebraska Amish. In the 1990s two more splits occurred, resulting in three Swartzentruber Amish groups: the Joe Troyer group, the main group, the Mose Miller/Isaac Keim group and the Andy Weaver group. The Swartzentruber Andy Weaver group should not be confused with the Old Order Andy Weaver group. In this three-way split the Andy Weaver group is the most conservative while the Joe Troyer group is at the other end of the spectrum, leaving the Mose Miller group somewhere in between.

Customs and technology 

Riding in cars is prohibited among the Swartzentruber Amish, except in emergencies, whereas average Old Order Amish are allowed to use cars as long as they do not own them. Swartzentrubers are the most restrictive concerning the use of technologies among all Amish affiliations, see table below.

Their style of dress tends to be heavier and plainer, especially in the case of women; only the Nebraska Amish dress in a more conservative style. Swartzentruber church services tend to be longer, even up to four hours.

Like some other Old Order groups, they avoid the use of electricity and indoor plumbing. Many other common devices and technologies are also disallowed for being too worldly, including Velcro and bicycles. Swartzentruber farms and yards are often unkept. The Swartzentrubers discourage interest in outward appearance, as such an interest could promote vanity and pride. Their farms can be identified by dirt drives and surrounding roads, while most roads of the Old Order contain either gravel or paving to keep out the mud. The roofs of the houses and outbuildings are often made of tin. The clothing differs from that of the other Old Order Amish in subtle ways: all colors are dark and somber rather than the bright blues and mauves; more common is navy, dark burgundy, and even gray. The dresses of the women, rather than reaching mid-calf, usually reach to the top of the shoes. The brims on the hats of Swartzentruber men are four inches wide, wider than the brims of more liberal affiliations.

The tack on the horses and buggies is often all black, rather than brown leather. Swartzentruber Amish use reflective tape on the back of their buggies, in place of bright triangular "slow moving" signs for road travel, which they regard as too worldly. These buggies will also use lanterns, rather than battery-operated lights or reflectors. The lanterns are also often staggered, one side slightly higher than the other, so as not to appear like the tail lights of a vehicle. There have been several court cases across the country where the state and county challenged the local Swartzentruber group to use the regulation orange triangle. So far, even as far as the federal Supreme Court, the Amish have prevailed, although statistics suggest that in areas where these groups exist, accidents involving buggies are more prevalent.

On September 13, 2011, nine Old Order Swartzentruber men were jailed for not paying a fine for refusing to display an orange reflective triangle on their horse-drawn carriages.

Swartzentruber Amish normally do not allow teenagers to leave the community during rumspringa, although most of them allow teenagers to "court" in order to find a marriage partner, which includes hugging in a bed while being fully clothed and rocking in a chair together.

Population and Church districts

As other conservative affiliations the Swartzentruber tend to have more children than the average Old Order Amish. In one sample that Kraybill et al. give, the average number of children born to Swartzentruber women was 9.3. Combined with a high rate of retention concerning their youth, the Swartzentruber have one of the highest growth rates among all Old Order Amish. Between 1991 and 2010 the number of church districts grew from 38 to 103, a growth of 171 percent.

In 1936 there were three Swartzentruber church districts and in 1957, five, with approximately 200 families. In 1944 a settlement was founded in Ethridge, Tennessee, which had ten church districts around 2013 with a population of 1,520 people. It is the largest Amish settlement in the South. The settlement near Lodi and Homerville, Ohio, which was founded in 1952 had 14 church districts around 2013 with a population of 2,148 people. In 1975 the settlement near Heuvelton, New York, was founded, that had 12 church districts around 2013 with a population of 1,671 people.

As of 2000, the Swartzentruber Amish had 64 districts, 3,165 members, a total population of 7,101 in 12 states with 33 districts in Ohio alone. There are nineteen districts of Swartzentruber in Holmes County and Wayne County, where the subgroup originated. The Swartzentruber share of the Old Order Amish is about 7 percent. As of 2011 there were 119 Swartzentruber Amish church districts and 43 settlements in 13 states of the US as well as in Ontario, Canada.

Etymology 
Swartzentruber is a Mennonite and Amish surname of Swiss origin, coming from the Trub river valley, located approximately midway between Bern and Lucerne. It has been thought to mean "seller of black grapes". Other English spellings of the name include Schwartzentruber, Swartzendruber, Schwartzendruber, Schwarzentruber, and Schwarztrauber.

See also 
 Nebraska Amish, the most conservative Amish subgroup

Literature 
 Donald B. Kraybill, Karen M. Johnson-Weiner and Steven M. Nolt: The Amish, Johns Hopkins University Press, Baltimore MD 2013. 
 Karen Johnson-Weiner: New York Amish: Life in the Plain Communities of the Empire State, Cornell University Press, Ithaca, NY 2017. 
 Charles Hurst and David McConnell: An Amish Paradox: Diversity and Change in the World's Largest Amish Community,  Johns Hopkins University Press, Baltimore MD 2010 
 Joe Mackall: Plain Secrets: An Outsider among the Amish, Boston, Mass. 2007.  (Account of a neighbor and friend to a Swartzentruber family)

References

External links
 Who are the Swartzentruber Amish? - Amish Online Encyclopedia entry on Swartzentruber Amish technology, history, and customs.

Old Order Amish
Ohio culture
People from Holmes County, Ohio
Swartzendruger Amish
Pennsylvania Dutch culture in Ohio
Swartzendruber Amish
Christian organizations established in 1917
Anabaptist denominations established in the 20th century